The 1986 Major League Baseball season saw the New York Mets win their second World Series title, their first since 1969.

Awards and honors
Baseball Hall of Fame
Bobby Doerr
Ernie Lombardi
Willie McCovey

Other awards
Outstanding Designated Hitter Award: Don Baylor (BOS)
Roberto Clemente Award (Humanitarian): Garry Maddox (PHI).
Rolaids Relief Man Award: Dave Righetti (NYY, American); Todd Worrell (STL, National).

Player of the Month

Pitcher of the Month

Statistical leaders

Standings

American League

National League

Postseason

Bracket

Managers

American League

National League

Home Field Attendance & Payroll

Television coverage

Events
 April 7 – On Opening Day at Tiger Stadium,  Dwight Evans of the Boston Red Sox achieves a major league first by hitting a home run off Jack Morris on the first pitch of the season.
 April 29 – Roger Clemens, age 23, struck out twenty Seattle Mariners at Fenway Park to set a major league record for a nine-inning game.
 June 6 – San Diego Padres manager Steve Boros is ejected before the first pitch, after showing the umpire video footage of a disputed play from the night before.

 September 25 – Houston Astros pitcher Mike Scott throws a no-hitter against the San Francisco Giants to clinch the National League West division title with a score of 2-0.

References

External links
1986 Major League Baseball season schedule at Baseball Reference

 
Major League Baseball seasons